Cozes is a commune in the Charente-Maritime department in southwestern France in the region of Nouvelle-Aquitaine. Its inhabitants are Cozillions .
The town of  Cozes forms part of the urban community Royan, which, as of 2006,  had a total population of 72,136 inhabitants.

It is part of the rural hinterland of Royan and is a hub of commercial activities and crafts.

The small town, is grouped around a church dating back to 12th and 13th centuries. Its perfectly preserved market place attracts increasing numbers of  tourists, who are brought into the area by its proximity to the resorts on the Coast of Beauty (La Côte de Beauté). It annually hosts various cultural events including the 'Southern Exposure' festival, dedicated to the cultures of Africa.

Population

See also
 Communes of the Charente-Maritime department

References

External links
 

Communes of Charente-Maritime
Charente-Maritime communes articles needing translation from French Wikipedia
County of Saintonge